Francis Patton Bretherton (6 July 1935 – 27 June 2021) was an applied mathematician and a professor emeritus of the Department of Atmospheric and Oceanic Sciences at the University of Wisconsin, Madison.

Early career 

After graduating from Cambridge University, he worked in the Department of Applied Mathematics and Theoretical Physics (DAMTP) at the University of Cambridge from 1962–1969, progressing from senior assistant in research, to assistant director of research, to university lecturer. In 1964, he introduced the Bretherton equation in applied mathematics. From 1969–1974, he was associated with the Johns Hopkins University, first as a professor in the Department of Earth & Planetary Sciences, and then as chief scientist at the Chesapeake Bay Institute.

UCAR and NCAR 

From 1973 to 1980, Bretherton was president of the University Corporation for Atmospheric Research in Boulder, Colorado. He was also director of the National Center for Atmospheric Research nearly concurrently, from 1974–1980. In 1980, he decided to return to scientific research studies, remaining at NCAR as a senior scientist. During that time he authored over 60 scientific papers.

SSEC and UW, Madison 

Bretherton was director of the Space Science and Engineering Center at the graduate school of the University of Wisconsin, Madison from 1988–1999. During that time the center "expanded to add global change studies and management of climate data".

Awards and honors 

Bretherton has received a number of honors and awards from institutions in  both the UK and the US. In 1960 he received the Smiths Prize from the University of Cambridge; in 1960–1962, he was a Research Fellow at Trinity College, Cambridge, and in 1962, he was a Fellow at King's College in Cambridge. In 1970, he was given the Buchan Prize from the Royal Meteorological Society, and in 1971, he received the World Meteorological Organization, Research Award, Area IV. The American Meteorological Society Clarence Leroy Meisinger Award and the American Meteorological Jule G. Charney Award were given to Dr. Bretherton in 1972 and 1982, respectively.

References

External links 
 OpenSky NCAR/UCAR Archives

1935 births
Academics of the University of Cambridge
University of Wisconsin–Madison faculty
Johns Hopkins University faculty
20th-century British mathematicians
Fellows of the Royal Society
Fellows of Trinity College, Cambridge
Fluid dynamicists
Living people